Cistus creticus (pink rock-rose, hoary rock-rose) is a species of shrubby plant in the family Cistaceae. Though it usually has pink flowers, of 4.5–5 cm diameter, this species is very variable. It is widely known as a decorative plant. It is frequently called "Cistus incanus". (The true Cistus × incanus is the hybrid C. albidus × C. crispus.)

Taxonomy
The name Cistus creticus was first used by Carl Linnaeus in 1762. Confusion exists between this name and one published earlier by Linnaeus, Cistus incanus. As used by many authors, but not Linnaeus, the name "C. incanus" is taken to refer to Cistus creticus, particularly C. creticus subsp. eriocephalus.

Subtaxa
Cistus creticus subsp. creticus
Cistus creticus subsp. corsicus (syn. Cistus × incanus subsp. corsicus)
Cistus creticus subsp. eriocephalus
Cistus creticus f. albus

There are also several well-known cultivars, such as 'Lasithi' with compact, rounded flowers.

Phylogeny
Cistus creticus belongs to the clade of species with purple and pink flowers (the "purple pink clade" or PPC), in a subclade with C. heterophyllus and C. albidus.

References

External links
 Malta Wild Plants
 Jepson Manual Treatment
 

creticus
Flora of Lebanon
Plants described in 1762
Taxa named by Carl Linnaeus
Flora of Malta
Flora of Bulgaria